Dactylorhiza maculata, known as the heath spotted-orchid or moorland spotted orchid, is an herbaceous perennial plant of the family Orchidaceae. It is widespread in mountainous regions across much of Europe from Portugal and Iceland east to Russia. It is also found in Algeria, Morocco, and western Siberia.

Etymology 
The name of the genus Dactylorhiza is formed from the Greek words δάκτυλος 'daktylos' meaning 'finger' and ρίζα 'ridza' meaning 'root' and refers to the tubers of this plant, which are split into several tubercles. The specific epithet 'maculata', meaning 'spotted', refers to the stained leaves. The scientific binomial name of this plant was initially Orchis maculata, proposed by the Swedish naturalist and botanist Carl Linnaeus in 1753. The name was changed to the one currently accepted (Dactylorhiza maculata) by the Hungarian botanist Károly Rezső Soó in 1962. In German this plant is called Geflecktes Knabenkraut, in French orchis tacheté, and in Italian orchide macchiata or erba d'Adamo.

Description 
These plants are bulbous geophytes, forming their buds in underground tubers or bulbs, organs that annually produce new stems, leaves and flowers. Furthermore these orchids are terrestrial:  unlike epiphytes they do not live on other large plants.

This orchid has an erect, glabrous and cylindrical stem, with a streaked surface. The leaves are oblong or oval-lanceolate, with dark ellipsoid-shaped spots on the surface (hence the species name). The leaves are amplexicaul and can be either radical (basal) or 
cauline.

The underground part of the stem has two webbed tubers, each deeply divided into several lobes or tubercles (characteristic of the genus Dactylorhiza).  The first one has the important function of supplying the stem whilst the second collects nutrients for the development of the plant that will form in the coming year.

The flowers grow in the axils of bracts membranous and lanceolate-shaped. Their colours vary from light pink to purple or white with darker streaks mainly on the labellum (sometimes at the margins of tepals). The flowers reach on average . The flowers are hermaphrodite and insect pollinated.

Habitat 
The heath spotted orchid prefers sunny places on lowlands or hills. It can be found in slightly damp meadows but also in the undergrowth of dry forests, in areas with bushes and at the edges of streams.

Ecology 
Orchids in the genus Dactylorhiza are mycorrhizal generalists. D. maculata has been found to form associations with a range of common species of mycorrhizal fungi in the Tulasnellaceae, as well as with species in the Ceratobasidiaceae and Sebacinales.

Dactylorhiza maculata is pollinated by insects, especially bumblebees. The flowers are 'food deceptive', i.e. do not provide nectar for their pollinators.

Subspecies 
Many names have been proposed for species and varieties in the species. As of June 2014, the following are accepted:

 Dactylorhiza maculata subsp. maculata (L.) Soó - most of species range
 Dactylorhiza maculata subsp. battandieri (Raynaud) H.Baumann & Künkele (1988) - Algeria
 Dactylorhiza maculata subsp. caramulensis Verm. (1970)  - France, Spain, Portugal
 Dactylorhiza maculata subsp. elodes (Griseb.) Soó (1962) - much of Europe from Portugal and Iceland east to European Russia
 Dactylorhiza maculata subsp. ericetorum (E.F.Linton) P.F.Hunt & Summerh. (1965) - British Isles, Sweden, Germany, France, Netherlands, Belgium, Spain
 Dactylorhiza maculata subsp. islandica (Á.Löve & D.Löve) Soó (1962)  - Iceland
 Dactylorhiza maculata subsp. podesta (Landwehr) Kreutz in C.A.J.Kreutz & H.Dekker (2000)  - Netherlands
 Dactylorhiza maculata subsp. savogiensis (D.Tyteca & Gathoye) Kreutz (2004) - France, Spain, Italy
 Dactylorhiza maculata subsp. schurii (Klinge) Soó (1967) - Romania, Ukraine
 Dactylorhiza maculata subsp. transsilvanica (Schur) Soó (1962) - Hungary, Bulgaria, Romania, Yugoslavia, Ukraine, Czech Republic

Gallery

References 

 Pignatti S. - Flora d'Italia (3 voll.) - Edagricole - 1982
 Tutin, T.G. et al. - Flora Europaea, second edition - 1993

External links 
 Den virtuella floran - Distribution
 Biolib
  Dactylorhiza maculata
 Manfred Hennecke

maculata
Plants described in 1753
Orchids of Europe
Orchids of Russia
Flora of Siberia
Taxa named by Carl Linnaeus